The 2013–14 Ball State Cardinals men's basketball team represented Ball State University during the 2013–14 NCAA Division I men's basketball season. The Cardinals, led by first year head coach James Whitford, played their home games at the John E. Worthen Arena as members of the West Division of the Mid-American Conference. They finished the season 5–25, 2–16 in MAC play to finish in last place in the West Division. They lost in the first round of the MAC tournament to Ohio.

Season

Preseason
On April 10, 2013, Ball State announced James Whitford as the 19th head coach in program history. Whitford had previously worked under Sean Miller as an assistant coach at Xavier and Arizona. On April 19, Whitford announced the first hiring of an assistant coach by hiring Brett Nelson. Nelson, a former honorable mention All-American at Florida, had previous assistant coaching experience at Marshall, Arkansas, and Drake. Jason Grunkemeyer was hired as the second assistant coach to Whitford's staff on April 26. Grunkemeyer, a former player at conference foe Miami, joined the staff after several years as an assistant at Saint Louis. On May 3, Whitford filled out his staff by hiring Billy Wright as his final assistant coach. Wright was previously the associate head coach at Western Illinois.

Whitford announced the team's conference schedule on September 3, 2013. Ball State schedule home-and-home series with Central Michigan, Eastern Michigan, Northern Illinois, Toledo, Western Michigan, Akron, and Buffalo, while hosting Miami and Bowling Green and visiting Kent State and Ohio. The non-conference schedule was released on September 24, 2013. Road trips to Utah and Marquette, along with hosting Butler highlighted the non-league slate.

November
The Cardinals traveled to Terre Haute, Indiana on November 9 to open their season against the Indiana State Sycamores. Despite a solid game from Zavier Turner (17 points), the Cardinals fell in James Whitford's debut, 73–82.

Roster

Schedule and results
Source: 

|-
!colspan=9 style="background:#C41E3A; color:#FFFFFF;"| Exhibition

|-
!colspan=9 style="background:#C41E3A; color:#FFFFFF;"| Non-conference games

|-
!colspan=9 style="background:#C41E3A; color:#FFFFFF;"| Conference games

|-
!colspan=9 style="background:#C41E3A; color:#FFFFFF;"| 2014 MAC tournament

References

Ball State
Ball State Cardinals men's basketball seasons